Migrasiýa is a men's volleyball team based in Ashgabat, Turkmenistan. Club of State Migration Service of Turkmenistan. It played in Turkmenistan Volleyball Championship. It represented Turkmenistan at the 2012, 2014 and 2015 Asian Men's Club Volleyball Championship . Migrasiýa means "migration" in Turkmen.

Current squad

Honours
Turkmenistan Championship
Champion (1): 2013

References

Turkmenistan volleyball clubs
Sport in Ashgabat
Men's volleyball teams